
Schuylkill Yards is a $3.5 billion, masterplanned development project by Brandywine Realty Trust in West Philadelphia. The project was announced in a press conference in March 2016.  The project is being designed in phases.  Groundbreaking occurred in late 2017, and the first piece—a public park called Drexel Square—was delivered in June 2019.

Announcement
The project was announced on March 2, 2016, in a press conference by Drexel University president John Fry. This was followed by an announcement in The Philadelphia Inquirer.

Usage and design

The design reveals multiple public spaces, each with their own distinct characteristics. A 1.3-acre plot (previously the parking lot at One Drexel Plaza) became a vibrant elliptical lawn and the center of Schuylkill Yards. 

If built, 3101 Market would be the second tallest building in Philadelphia, or the third tallest if 2901 Arch Street of the 30th Street Station District is built.

See also
 30th Street Station District
 List of tallest buildings in Philadelphia

References

Proposed skyscrapers in the United States
Urban development
Multi-building developments in Philadelphia